The Grady College of Journalism and Mass Communication is a constituent college of the University of Georgia in Athens, Georgia, United States. Established in 1915, Grady College offers undergraduate degrees in journalism, advertising, public relations, and entertainment and media studies, and master's and doctoral programs of study. Grady has consistently been ranked among the top schools of journalism education and research in the U.S. 

The college is home to several prominent centers, awards, and institutes, including the Peabody Awards, recognized as one of the most prestigious awards in electronic journalism, the McGill Medal for Journalistic Courage, the James M. Cox Jr. Center for International Mass Communication Training and Research, the New Media Institute, and National Press Photographers Association.

History 
In 1915, Grady was founded as a school of journalism by Steadman Vincent Sanford, a young professor who later as president (1932–35) and chancellor (1935–45) of the University System of Georgia, was the architect of the modern University of Georgia. Classes were first held in the Academic Building near the university's iconic Arch just off Broad Street. Early courses included newspaper reporting and correspondence, editorial writing, history and principles of journalism, psychology of business procedure and newspaper advertising. In 1921, the school's name was changed to the Henry W. Grady School of Journalism in honor of university alumnus Henry W. Grady, an Athens native and white supremacist who served as part-owner and managing editor of the Atlanta Constitution in the 1880s.

Grady's first graduate, in 1921, Lamar Trotti, became a producer of major motion pictures for 20th Century Fox. He received an Academy Award for Writing Original Screenplay in 1945 for Wilson. The second graduate, in 1922, John Eldridge Drewry, became the school's longest serving director and dean (1932–69), and created a national reputation for the school. In 1940, Drewry established the George Foster Peabody Awards to address the fact that Columbia University, home of the Pulitzer Prize, did not accept radio broadcast entries (Peabody Awards for television were introduced in 1948 and categories for material distributed via the World Wide Web were added in the 1990s). By 1929, enrollment at Grady, which had moved into the south wing of the Commerce-Journalism Building the previous year, was nearly 70 students and included 20 women who graduated with bachelor's degrees in journalism. A master's degree program was authorized in 1938.

In 1961, Charlayne Hunter-Gault, along with Hamilton E. Holmes, became the first two African-American students to desegregate the University of Georgia. In 1963, Hunter-Gault graduated with a journalism degree from Grady and went on to a notable career in multimedia news reporting. The current Journalism Building located just north of Sanford Stadium was dedicated in 1969. A doctoral program was established in 1983. Two years later, the James M. Cox Jr. Center for International Mass Communication Training and Research began operations and has since conducted hundreds of training programs involving countries across the world, and published numerous research and technical reports. The New Media Institute was founded in 2000 to explore the creative, critical and commercial implications of emerging digital communication technologies. In 2015, the National Press Photographers Association moved its headquarters to Grady.

Academics 
Grady comprises three academic departments: journalism, advertising and public relations, and entertainment and media studies. Admission to the undergraduate program is selective and open to students who have completed their sophomore year. The college provides instruction at the undergraduate and graduate levels in a range of subject areas including public relations, advertising, broadcast and multimedia journalism, photojournalism, new media, communication, publication management, media innovation and entrepreneurship, and screenwriting.

Experiential learning through capstone courses like Grady Newsource; study-abroad experiences like Cannes-Lions and Choose China; and involvement with clubs like Talking Dog and PRSSA, provide experiences beyond the classroom. Many students work on the award-winning, independent student newspaper, The Red and Black, and its lifestyle publication, Ampersand Magazine, as well as the student-operated WUOG, a radio station broadcasting to Athens and surrounding areas.

Degrees offered by the college 
 Bachelor of Arts in Journalism (A.B.)
 Bachelor of Arts in Advertising (A.B.)
 Bachelor of Arts in Public Relations (A.B.)
 Bachelor of Arts in Entertainment and Media Studies (A.B.J.)
 Master of Arts in Journalism (M.A.)
 Master of Arts in Advertising (M.A.)
 Master of Arts in Public Relations (M.A.)
 Master of Arts in AdPR 4+1 (M.A.)
 Master of Arts in Mass Media Studies (M.A.)
 Master of Arts in Health and Medical Journalism (M.A.)
 Master of Arts in Emerging Media (M.A.)
 Master of Fine Arts in Film, Television and Digital Media
 Master of Fine Arts in Narrative Media Writing (MFA)
 Master of Fine Arts in Screenwriting (MFA)
 Doctor of Philosophy in Mass Communication (Ph.D.)

Certificates offered by the college 
 Grady Sports Media Certificate
 New Media Institute Certificate
 Media Analytics Certificate
 Public Affairs Professional Certificate

Research programs 
Grady houses the following centers, institutes and affiliates for research and education:
 George Foster Peabody Awards
 Peabody Media Center
 James M. Cox Jr. Center for International Mass Communication Training and Research
 James M. Cox Jr. Institute for Journalism Innovation, Management and Leadership
 New Media Institute
 Center for Health and Risk Communication
 National Press Photographers Association
 Georgia Scholastic Press Association

Peabody Awards 

In 1938, leaders of the National Association of Broadcasters asked Lambdin Kay, WSB station manager in Atlanta, to create an award for excellence in broadcasting. He turned to Drewy, Grady's dean, for sponsorship. The result was the creation in 1940 of the George Foster Peabody Awards, named after a benefactor to the University of Georgia. The next year, the Peabody Awards were first presented to six distinguished radio winners at the Commodore Hotel in New York City. Grady has since administered the award to recognize outstanding achievements in radio, television and digital media.

More than a thousand submissions are judged annually by the Peabody Board of Jurors, made up of respected media professionals, media scholars, critics and journalists. The board meets at least three times, with the final viewing and discussion session held at the university. To win a Peabody in one of about 30 categories, ranging from news, entertainment and public service to documentary, children's and web/interactive programming, a program must receive the unanimous approval of all board members. Past Peabody winners include Edward R. Murrow, Walter Cronkite, Barbara Walters, BBC, 60 Minutes and Al Jazeera.

Accreditation 
Grady is accredited by the Accrediting Council on Education in Journalism and Mass Communications.

Notable alumni 

The following is a list of some notable alumni in the fields of journalism, media and communication:

 Lamar Trotti (1922) – Academy Award-winning motion picture producer
 Ernest Camp Jr. (1926) – founder of the Society of Professional Journalists
 Eugene Patterson (1943) – Pulitzer Prize-winning editor of Washington Post
 Edwin Pope (1948) – Miami Herald sports columnist
 Jack Avrett (1950) – founder of Avrett Free Ginsberg advertising agency; American Advertising Federation chairman
 Gene Methvin (1955) – Reader's Digest senior editor
 Donald A. Davis (1962) – New York Times best-selling author; UPI correspondent
 Charlayne Hunter-Gault (1963) – Peabody Award and Emmy Award-winning reporter
 Tom Johnson (1963) – chief executive, CNN and Los Angeles Times; White House Fellow
 Harry Chapman (1967) – longtime WTVF news anchor in Nashville, Tennessee
 Cecile Bledsoe (1968) – member of the Arkansas State Senate
 John Holliman (1970) – CNN war correspondent
 John Huey (1970) – Time Inc. editor-in-chief, columnist
 Maxine Clark (1971) — founder of Build-A-Bear
 Brenda Hampton (1972) – creator and executive producer, 7th Heaven and The Secret Life of the American Teenager
 Randall Savage (1972) – Pulitzer Prize-winning journalist
 Kathy Trocheck (1976) – a.k.a. Mary Kay Andrews, New York Times best-selling author
 Bonnie Arnold (1977) – film producer, Walt Disney Feature Animation, Pixar and DreamWorks Animation
 Deborah Blum (1977) – Pulitzer Prize-winning science writer
 Randy Jones (1977) – founder of Worth magazine; CEO of Capital Publishing Inc.
 Ed Grisamore (1978) – The Telegraph columnist; Will Rogers Humanitarian Award recipient
 Ernie Johnson Jr. (1978) – sportscaster, Turner Sports and CBS Sports
 Doreen Gentzler (1979) – longtime WRC-TV news anchor in Washington, D.C.
 Deborah Norville (1979) – host of Inside Edition; former CBS News anchor; former Today co-host
 Steve Oney (1979) – author, former magazine staff writer, and Nieman Fellow at Harvard University
 Martha Zoller (1979) – syndicated radio host, television personality and writer
 Deborah Roberts (1982) – ABC News television journalist
 Jackie Crosby (1983) – Pulitzer Prize-winning journalist
 Lewis Grizzard (1984) – syndicated Atlanta Journal-Constitution columnist; Chicago Sun-Times editor
 Julie Moran (1984) – first female host of ABC's Wide World of Sports; former Entertainment Tonight host
 Chip Caray (1987) – sports broadcaster
 Mark B. Perry (1989) – Primetime Emmy Award-winning television producer and writer
 Brent Poer (1990) – president & chief marketing officer of Zenith USA, Moxie & MRY
 Lisa (Ryan) Howard— (1992) – senior vice president and general manager at The New York Times
 Josh Jackson (1994) – co-founder of Paste magazine
 Amy Robach (1995) – television journalist for ABC News, Good Morning America
 Ryan Seacrest (dropped out, honorary 2016) – television producer; radio personality; host of American Idol and Live with Kelly and Ryan
 Mark Schlabach (1997) – ESPN sportswriter
 Meredith Seacrest (1999) — executive director and COO of Ryan Seacrest Foundation
 Brooke Anderson (2000) – CNN anchor and producer; Entertainment Tonight correspondent
 Mary Katharine Ham (2002) – CNN and Fox News Channel contributor
 Nancy Mace (2004) – U.S. Congresswoman representing South Carolina's 1st Congressional District
 Maria Taylor (2009) – sports journalist, ESPN and SEC Network
 Monica Pearson (2014) – longtime WSB-TV news anchor in Atlanta, Georgia

References

Literature 
 Clark, E. Culpepper. 2015. Centennial: A History of Henry W. Grady College of Journalism and Mass Communications at the University of Georgia. Mercer University Press.

External links 
 

1915 establishments in Georgia (U.S. state)
Colleges and schools of the University of Georgia
Educational institutions established in 1915
Journalism schools in the United States